Jaroslav Lukeš (born 5 February 1912) was a Czech skier. He competed at the 1936 Winter Olympics and the 1948 Winter Olympics.

References

External links
 

1912 births
Year of death missing
Czech male cross-country skiers
Czech male Nordic combined skiers
Czech male ski jumpers
Olympic cross-country skiers of Czechoslovakia
Olympic Nordic combined skiers of Czechoslovakia
Olympic ski jumpers of Czechoslovakia
Cross-country skiers at the 1948 Winter Olympics
Nordic combined skiers at the 1948 Winter Olympics
Ski jumpers at the 1936 Winter Olympics
Ski jumpers at the 1948 Winter Olympics
Place of birth missing